St. Naum Peak is a rocky peak of elevation 560 m in the east extremity of Peshev Ridge, Tangra Mountains, Livingston Island in the South Shetland Islands, Antarctica.  Separated from Balchik Ridge and Silistra Knoll to the east by Starosel Gate, and surmounting Macy Glacier to the north and Boyana Glacier to the south.

The peak is named after the Bulgarian scholar St. Naum of Preslav and Ohrid (—910 AD), brother of St. Kliment Ohridski and student of St. Cyril and St. Methodius who worked under the auspices of Czar Boris I of Bulgaria both in Veliki Preslav and Devol.

Location

Maps
 L.L. Ivanov et al. Antarctica: Livingston Island and Greenwich Island, South Shetland Islands. Scale 1:100000 topographic map. Sofia: Antarctic Place-names Commission of Bulgaria, 2005.
 L.L. Ivanov. Antarctica: Livingston Island and Greenwich, Robert, Snow and Smith Islands. Scale 1:120000 topographic map.  Troyan: Manfred Wörner Foundation, 2009.  
 L.L. Ivanov. Antarctica: Livingston Island and Smith Island. Scale 1:100000 topographic map. Manfred Wörner Foundation, 2017.

References
 St. Naum Peak. SCAR Composite Gazetteer of Antarctica.
 Bulgarian Antarctic Gazetteer. Antarctic Place-names Commission. (details in Bulgarian, basic data in English)

External links
 St. Naum Peak. Copernix satellite image

Tangra Mountains